Diego Carpitella (Reggio di Calabria, 12 June 1924 – Rome, 7 August 1990) was an Italian professor of ethnomusicology at D'Annunzio University of Chieti–Pescara and La Sapienza University in Rome. He is considered one of the greatest scholars of Italian folk music and has written and published many essays on the subject. He collaborated with the Centro Nazionale Studi di Musica Popolare from 1952 to 1958, collecting more than 5,000 Italian folk songs. He was also the founding editor of the journal Culture musicali and a co-founder of the cultural magazine Marcatre.

External links
  Complete Carpitella bibliography

Further reading
Agamennone, Maurizio and L. Di Mitra, eds. L'eredità di Diego Carpitella.Etnomusicologia, antropologia e ricerca storica nel Salento e nell'area mediterranea. (2003) Nardò, Besa Editrice.

References

Italian folk musicians
1924 births
1990 deaths
20th-century Italian musicians
Academic staff of the D'Annunzio University of Chieti–Pescara
Academic staff of the Sapienza University of Rome
Italian magazine editors
20th-century Italian musicologists